Collingham College is a private, co-educational school, founded as Collingham Tutors in 1975, by Old Etonian John Marsden and Nicholas Browne. Collingham is situated in London's Royal Borough of Kensington and Chelsea. It is directly between Earl's Court and Gloucester Road stations, both served by the District and the Piccadilly lines. Collingham's campus includes the sixth form building at 23 Collingham Gardens, and the GCSE school occupying a Georgian townhouse on Young Street by Kensington Palace.The Principal of Collingham is Sally Powell, BA PGCE MPhil Oxon and the Deputy Principal is James Allder BA. Many of the tutors at Collingham are expert academics, who join the school after professional careers in their field. Mock admissions tests and interviews are available for Oxbridge applicants. There are about two hundred and fifty students at Collingham. Pupils come from a range of academic abilities and backgrounds, with many joining from public schools. They run Christmas and Easter revision courses near to exams which are available to the public. 

According to the Good Schools Guide, "You go to Collingham for two things - the academics and the sense of being independent while, in reality, being nurtured and carefully monitored. The level of support given to students is exceptional, reflected in a growth of confidence and the desire to succeed." Collingham was originally founded from Gibbs' Preparatory School.

Former pupils include Prince Edward, Duke of Edinburgh, David Armstrong-Jones, 2nd Earl of Snowdon, Robert Kennedy, Ted Kennedy and Frederick Tennyson.

The Boltons Garden Party 
Collingham students support and attend the annual St Mary The Boltons summer fair, held in The Boltons garden square every June.

Alumni 
(Collingham and as it was previously known Gibbs Prep)

Royalty and Nobility 
Prince Edward, Duke of Edinburgh
 David Armstrong-Jones, 2nd Earl of Snowdon
 Thomas Corbett, 2nd Baron Rowallan, British Army Officer, Grenadier Guards
 Anthony Havelock-Allan, 4th Baronet

Politicians 
Robert F. Kennedy
 Ted Kennedy
 Allan Henry Hoover
 Herbert Hoover Jr.
Claiborne Pell
The Lord Grimond
John Profumo

Film directors and actors 

 Frederick Tennyson
 Sir Peter Alexander von Ustinov
 Richard Armitage
 Anthony Asquith

Novelists 

 Sir John Mortimer
 Christopher Robin Milne, Christopher Robin from Winnie-the-Pooh
 Anthony Powell

Other 

 Sir Richard Doll FRS, Epidemiologist
Georgia May Jagger, Socialite
Matthew Warburton

References

External links

1975 establishments in England
Educational institutions established in 1975
Private co-educational schools in London
Private schools in the Royal Borough of Kensington and Chelsea